KPCC (89.3 FM) – branded LAist 89.3 – is a non-commercial educational radio station licensed to Pasadena, California, primarily serving Greater Los Angeles and the San Fernando Valley. KPCC also reaches much of Santa Barbara, Ventura County, Palm Springs and the Coachella Valley, and extends throughout Southern California with five low-power broadcast relay stations and three full-power repeaters. Owned by Pasadena City College and operated by the American Public Media Group via Southern California Public Radio, KPCC broadcasts a mix of public radio and news, and is an owned-and-operated station for American Public Media; in addition to serving as an affiliate for NPR and Public Radio Exchange; and is the radio home for Sandra Tsing Loh and Larry Mantle. Besides a standard analog transmission, KPCC broadcasts over two HD Radio channels, and is available online. The studios are located in Pasadena, while the station transmitter is on Mount Wilson.

History
The station originally signed on the air in 1957 from the Pasadena City College campus as KPCS; the call sign stood for Pasadena City Schools, which operated the college before the advent of the state-controlled Pasadena Area Community College District. It used the former KWKW-FM 250-watt transmitter and studio equipment, and a small antenna on the roof of the campus administration building that provided limited coverage. The station was operated by, and for, students who were studying broadcasting at the college. KPCS changed to KPCC on December 1, 1979. KPCC rebranded to LAist on February 7, 2023.

Formerly, the station broadcast from a transmitter in Orange County, later from Downtown Los Angeles (at the Frank Stanton Studios), and on the PCC campus. The station originally broadcast from the campus of Pasadena City College in Pasadena. KPCC decided to invest in a $24.5 million modern facility. In February 2010, the station moved to a  converted office building on Raymond Avenue in Pasadena named the Mohn Broadcast Center and Crawford Family Forum.

The station is operated by Southern California Public Radio, a group owned by American Public Media Group (the parent organization of Minnesota Public Radio). However the license remains in the hands of Pasadena City College (PCC); the station is usually identified as a "public service of Pasadena City College" at the top of each hour. Since the APM takeover, PCC student participation has been reduced to internships supported by American Public Media.

PCC's contract with American Public Media permits either side to terminate the arrangement after giving sufficient notice, APM with six months notice and PCC with five years notice after 2015 (effectively making it a 20-year contract with an unlimited option to renew). PCC gets on air recognition and funding for a broadcast internship program (along with the traditional responsibility of maintaining FCC-related issues as the licensee), while APM controls the station and all the pledges, grants, and corporate underwriting revenues.

SCPR acquired the rights to relaunch the LAist brand, which was formerly under the Gothamist blog. On January 31, 2023, Southern California Public Radio announced KPCC would move away from its call letters and adopt the "LAist" brand name across all its platforms, including the radio station. The call letters for the radio station will still be KPCC after the re-brand is completed.

KPCC reaches 600,000 listeners each week.

Current programming 
Weekday programming on KPCC includes:Take Two with A Martínez; AirTalk with Larry Mantle; The Frame with John Horn; and Off-Ramp with John Rabe. The programs The Madeleine Brand Show and Patt Morrison were replaced in 2012. The station also produces Sandra Tsing Loh's The Loh Down on Science, a 60-second science feature on weekdays, and The Loh Life on weekends, which features her commentary on various issues.

HD broadcasting 
KPCC broadcasts over two HD Radio channels:
 HD1 simulcasts the analog feed; and
 HD2 airs alternative rock via a simulcast of KCMP/Minneapolis (branded "The Current"). Both subchannels also stream live on the Internet.

Repeaters, translators, and boosters 
KPCC also extends its signal via full-power satellites KUOR-FM Redlands (89.1 FM), KVLA-FM Coachella (90.3 FM), and KJAI Ojai (89.5 FM), as well as low-power translators KPCC-FM1 Santa Clarita (89.3 FM), KPCC-FM2 West Los Angeles (89.3 FM), KPCC-FM3 West Los Angeles (89.3 FM), K210AD Santa Barbara (89.9 FM) and K227BX Palm Springs (93.3 FM). KUOR is licensed to the University of Redlands, while KVLA and KJAI are licensed to American Public Media Group's SCPR. All three of the station's full-power repeaters also broadcast two HD Radio signals.

References

Further reading

KPCC's page on StylusCity

External links

 

PCC
NPR member stations
American Public Media Group
PCC
Entertainment companies based in California
Mass media in Los Angeles County, California
Mass media in Pasadena, California
Mass media in the Inland Empire
News and talk radio stations in the United States

Pasadena City College